"11th Dimension" is a song by Julian Casablancas and is the lead single from his debut album Phrazes for the Young. It was first performed live on the talk show The Tonight Show with Conan O'Brien on October 27, 2009. Pitchfork Media awarded the track as "Best New Track" and rated "11th Dimension" the 66th best song of 2009, calling it "the strongest [Julian's] sounded since Room on Fire. It's a blast of retro-futuristic synths, steam-rolling guitar licks, and slicing, dicing hi-hat, and the busy pulse of the production cuts through the detachment and manages to convey a sense of fun, as if he's finally enjoying the creative experience".

Music video 

The music video for "11th Dimension" premiered on Babelgum on December 23, 2009.  The video was directed by longtime Strokes collaborator Warren Fu, and was loosely inspired by Bruce Lee's Game of Death. The video features Danielle Haim (the lead singer of Haim) as the drummer in the background of the video.

Track listing

Personnel
Studio version
Julian Casablancas - vocals, all instruments, songwriting
Jason Lader - all instruments, production
Blake Mills - guitar
Lenny Castro - shaker

Live performances
Julian Casablancas - vocals
JP Bowersock - guitar
Alex Carapetis - drums
Danielle Haim - percussion, backing vocals
Jeff Kite - keyboards
Nelson London - keyboards, guitar
Blake Mills - guitar

Charts

References

2009 singles
Songs written by Julian Casablancas
2009 songs
Rough Trade Records singles
11 (number)

Music videos directed by Warren Fu